Carlos Goñi Zubieta (born 7 April 1963) is a Spanish philosopher, writer and teacher. He has a doctor's degree in philosophy from Universidad de Barcelona.

Zubieta is married to Pilar Guembe, with whom he has two children, Adrián and Paula. With Pilar, Guembe has written books on child education, such as Educar entre los dos (2017), Educar sin castigar (2013), Aprender de los hijos (2012) and No me ralles (2007). He was awarded the Premio de Ensayo Becerro de Bengoa in 2010, and the Premi de Filosofía Arnau de Vilanova in 2005.

Works

References

1963 births
Spanish philosophers
Spanish children's writers
Spanish male writers
21st-century Spanish writers
Living people